Edgar Jewell Crowley (August 20, 1906 – April 14, 1970) was a Major League Baseball third baseman. He attended the Georgia Institute of Technology, playing baseball and football. He was captain of the Southern Conference champion 1927 football team.

References

External links

Major League Baseball third basemen
Washington Senators (1901–1960) players
Baseball players from Georgia (U.S. state)
1906 births
1970 deaths
People from Watkinsville, Georgia
Georgia Tech Yellow Jackets football players
Georgia Tech Yellow Jackets baseball players
All-Southern college football players
American football ends